This list is of the Intangible Cultural Properties of Japan in the Prefecture of Gifu.

National Cultural Properties
As of 1 July 2015, four Important Intangible Cultural Properties have been designated, being of national significance.

Craft Techniques

Prefectural Cultural Properties
As of 2 March 2015, five properties have been designated at a prefectural level.

Craft Techniques

Municipal Cultural Properties
As of 1 May 2014, thirty properties have been designated at a municipal level.

References

External links
  Cultural Properties in Gifu Prefecture

Culture in Gifu Prefecture
Gifu